Swisse is a vitamin, supplement, and skincare brand. Founded in Australia in 1969 and globally headquartered in Melbourne, and was sold to Health & Happiness, a Chinese company based in Hong Kong previously known as Biostime International, in a $1.7 billion, two-step deal in 2015 & 2016.

Swisse states that they aims to select the most nutrient-rich ingredients worldwide, and uses formulations based on scientific and traditional evidence. The company is currently an official team partner for the Australian Olympics Team through to 2024.

Swisse products are currently available in Australia, New Zealand, Singapore, South Korea, Indonesia, China, Hong Kong, India, U.S., France, Italy, Switzerland and the Netherlands. Swisse's parent company is international family health and wellness provider H&H Group, publicly listed on the Hong Kong Stock Exchange. Measured by sales, it is Australia's top multivitamin brand.

Products

The Swisse vitamin and supplement product range caters to all stages of life – from pre-conception supplements for men and women, to infants, children, teenagers and adults of various ages to the elderly. Swisse Ultivite multivitamin products are unique in that they were the first products targeted to gender and specific age ranges globally.

Swisse drives product innovation from its global headquarters in Melbourne, maintaining a laser focus on quality. In recent years it has released products in a number of consumption formats, such as liquids, vegetarian-friendly capsules, dissolvable powders and effervescents with natural fruit flavourings, to reflect various consumers’ preferences. Swisse aims to avoid added sugars, and work to ensure products are as ‘clean’ as possible in formulating for bioavailability and minimising excipients.

Swisse has also recently released a product range combining probiotics, nutrients, and herbs, as well as a range using Australian hemp seed oil, which the company believes "will play an important role in the delivery of incremental growth for Swisse ANZ in 2020." Swisse Beauty's 'Healthy Beautiful' range launched in early 2020.

Legal issues
In 2013 Avni Sali, the father of former CEO Radek Sali, sued the Australian Broadcasting Corporation for defamation over a The Checkout segment on Swisse products which claimed that he manipulated clinical tests of a Swisse appetite suppressant to benefit the company. The ABC stood by the segment, and Australia's dietary supplement regulator, the Therapeutic Goods Administration (TGA), nullified the product's legal registration due to "insufficient evidence to support the indications for the product and the presentation of the product was unacceptable" during the course of the suit.  The company promptly registered a new product with the same ingredient under the name 'Ultiboost Hunger Control' instead of 'Ultiboost Appetite Suppressant.' The case was eventually settled out of court with no settlement paid and each party paying its own legal fees.

In 2012, the TGA's Complaints Resolution Panel ordered the company to cease use of the terms “clinically proven” and “independently tested” in its promotional materials, in addition to the tagline “Tired? Stressed? You’ll feel better on Swisse.”

Spokespeople
Swisse's global ambassadors are actor Chris Hemsworth, Nicole Kidman and Elsa Pataky. Other ambassadors include Ricky Ponting and  Ashley Hart. Indian stars Nushrat Bharucha and Kriti Kharbanda supported Swisse's launch in the Indian market in early 2020.

References

Health care companies established in 1969
1969 establishments in Australia
Manufacturing companies based in Melbourne
Australian brands
2015 mergers and acquisitions
Nutritional supplement companies of Australia